is a passenger railway station located in Naka-ku, Yokohama, Kanagawa Prefecture, Japan, operated by the East Japan Railway Company (JR East).

Lines

Station layout 
The station consists of two elevated opposed side platforms serving two tracks, with the station building underneath. Both tracks are utilised by the Keihin-Tōhoku Line and Yokohama Line. The station is staffed.

Platforms

History
Yamate Station was opened on  May 9, 1964. The station was absorbed into the JR East network upon the privatization of the Japan National Railways (JNR) in 1987.

Passenger statistics
In fiscal 2019, the station was used by an average of 17,545 passengers daily (boarding passengers only).

The passenger figures (boarding passengers only) for previous years are as shown below.

Surrounding area
 Negishi Forest Park / Equine Museum
Yokohama Foreign General Cemetery
Yamate Park
 Yokohama City Tateno Elementary School
Yokohama City Nakaodai Junior High School
Yokohama National University
Seiko Gakuin Junior and Senior High School

See also
 List of railway stations in Japan

References

External links

 

Naka-ku, Yokohama
Railway stations in Kanagawa Prefecture
Railway stations in Japan opened in 1964
Keihin-Tōhoku Line
Negishi Line
Railway stations in Yokohama